This is a list of WWE pay-per-view and WWE Network events, detailing all professional wrestling cards promoted on pay-per-view (PPV) and the WWE Network by WWE. Due to the American version of the WWE Network merging under Peacock, and with the WWE Network still available in international markets, as well as less focus being given to traditional PPV channels, in 2022, the company began using the term "Premium Live Event" to refer to their events airing on PPV and the livestreaming services.

WWE has been broadcasting PPV events since the 1980s, when its classic "Big Four" events (Royal Rumble, WrestleMania, SummerSlam, and Survivor Series) were first established—the company's very first PPV was WrestleMania I in 1985. The company's PPV lineup expanded to a monthly basis in the mid-1990s before expanding even further in the mid-2000s. In addition, WWE produced international PPVs not available in the United States between 1997 and 2003. In 2022, the company began recognizing Money in the Bank as one of their five biggest events of the year, thus making it a "Big Five" event along with the classic "Big Four"; King of the Ring was considered a "Big Five" event from 1993 until 2002, after which, it was discontinued as a PPV.

Following WWE's original brand extension in 2002, the company promoted two touring rosters representing its Raw and SmackDown television programs. The traditional "Big Four" continued to showcase the entire roster, while the remaining PPV events alternated between Raw and SmackDown cards. A special ECW PPV in 2005 led to the creation of an ECW brand in 2006, which also received its own dedicated PPV events. In March 2007, WWE announced that all subsequent PPV events would feature performers from all brands. In 2008, all WWE PPV events began broadcasting in high-definition.

The company's PPV business began to drastically change with the launch of the online streaming service, the WWE Network, on February 24, 2014. WWE's focus shifted away from delivering their events solely on PPV channels, with their main focus on delivering all of the events on the WWE Network, including some exclusive events, such as NXT Arrival. Beginning with the 2021 edition of Fastlane, WWE PPVs began airing on NBCUniversal's streaming service, Peacock, in the United States, following a merger of the American WWE Network under Peacock in March that year. The standalone version of the American WWE Network shutdown on April 4; the rest of the world maintains the separate WWE Network service.

After the second brand extension in July 2016, brand-exclusive PPVs returned with the "Big Four" as the only PPVs to feature both Raw and SmackDown brands. However, brand-exclusive PPVs ended after WrestleMania 34 in April 2018. Beginning with TakeOver 31 in October 2020, NXT TakeOver events started airing on traditional PPV in addition to livestreaming. In late 2021, however, WWE discontinued the NXT TakeOver series.

In addition to Peacock's WWE Network channel, WWE PPVs are still made available on traditional PPV outlets in the United States. In Canada, WWE PPVs are available through Vu!, Shaw PPV, or SaskTel PPV, and are shown in select locations of the Cineplex Entertainment chain. In Australia, WWE's pay-per-views are shown on Main Event. In the United Kingdom and Ireland, all PPVs were shown on Sky Sports Box Office until 2019, when BT Sport took over rights to WWE content. In India and South Asia, a single broadcaster (currently Sony Ten) generally holds the rights to all WWE programming, with PPVs broadcast for no additional charge.

Currently, WWE PPV events are typically 3 hours in length, with some events running longer or shorter. The NXT TakeOver events typically ran between 2 and 3 hours. WWE also airs a pre-show before most PPV events known as the Kickoff show which includes interviews, match previews, and a panel of experts analyzing the upcoming line-up (the pre-shows also used to host some matches but these were phased out in early 2022). WWE occasionally airs a post-show after some events known as Fallout. Each post-show includes interviews and a panel of experts analyzing the event. WWE previously held Raw Talk post-shows for Raw-branded events and Talking Smack for SmackDown-branded events; both still air, but only after the weekly television programs, with the latter airing the next day after SmackDowns broadcast. Since late 2022, some PPVs have also had post-event media press conferences.

Past events

1980s

1985

1986

1987

1988

1989

1990s

1990

1991

1992

1993

1994

1995

1996

1997

1998

1999

2000s

2000

2001

2002

2003

2004

2005

2006

2007

2008

2009

2010s

2010

2011

2012

2013

2014
The WWE Network was launched on February 24, 2014. Every pay-per-view event from this point forward aired on both traditional PPV outlets and the WWE Network. However, beginning with NXT Arrival, several additional events began airing exclusively on the Network. The Network exclusives are noted.

2015

2016

2017

2018

2019

2020s

2020

2021

2022

2023

Upcoming event schedule

2023

2024

Number of events by year

Overall total — 486 (9 more confirmed)

Most pay-per-view matches
These ten wrestlers have the most PPV matches as of Elimination Chamber 2023.

Only the actual pay-per-view matches are counted, no pre-show or dark matches.

Themed events
Many WWE events are thematic, centered on particular types of matches, or have an annually recurring main event. Most themed events (sans the "Big Five" pay-per-view events) are roughly treated like filler themed events to carry the audience until the next event dating back to the days when the In Your House system was used.

See also
 List of AEW ppv events
 List of ECW supercards and ppv events
 List of FMW supercards and ppv events
 List of GFW specials and ppv events
 List of MLW specials and ppv events
 List of NWA ppv events
 List of major NJPW events
 List of ROH ppv events
 List of TNA / Impact Wrestling ppv events
List of Impact Plus events
 List of WCCW supercard events
 List of WCW closed-circuit events and ppv events
 List of WCW Clash of the Champions shows
 List of WWE Saturday Night's Main Event shows
 List of WWE Tribute to the Troops shows

References

External links
 
 
 

 
 
Events